NGC 41 is a spiral galaxy located in the constellation Pegasus. It is located about 290 million light-years (90 Megaparsecs) away from the Sun. It was discovered on October 30, 1864, by the astronomer Albert Marth.

References

External links
 

Spiral galaxies
0041
18641030
Pegasus (constellation)